The Rural Municipality of Maryfield No. 91 is a rural municipality (RM) in the Canadian province of Saskatchewan within Census Division No. 1 and  Division No. 1. It is located in the southeast portion of the province.

History 
The RM of Maryfield No. 91 incorporated as a rural municipality on December 9, 1912.

Geography

Communities and localities 
The following urban municipalities are surrounded by the RM.

Villages
 Fairlight
 Maryfield

The following unincorporated communities are within the RM.

Localities
 Ryerson

Demographics 

Attractions 
Maryfield holds an annual indoor rodeo in July.

Government 
The RM of Maryfield No. 91 is governed by an elected municipal council and an appointed administrator that meets on the second Thursday of every month. The reeve of the RM is Cameron Thompson while its administrator is Daphne Brady. The RM's office is located in Maryfield.

References 

M

Division No. 1, Saskatchewan